"(In My) Solitude" is a 1934 composition by Duke Ellington, with lyrics by Eddie DeLange and Irving Mills. It has been recorded numerous times and is considered a jazz standard.

Ellington reported that he composed it in a recording studio in 20 minutes, as his orchestra had arrived with three pieces to record and required another. It is in D major and has an AABA form (although "the IV chord in measure 3 is replaced by a II7 the second time"). According to Ellington, the title was suggested by trumpeter Arthur Whetsel. An AllMusic writer describes the composition as "at once optimistic in its tone but somber in its pace, conflicted with the emotions of bitter loneliness and fond remembrance". The mood is set "in the very first phrase of the melody, with its ascent to the leading tone of the scale falling just short of the tonic, and in the seemingly unremarkable chord progressions that nevertheless manage to transform harmonic resolution into wistful resignation".

The first recording of the song was by Ellington on January 10, 1934. His second version, from September of the same year, reached No. 2 on the charts in 1935. The Mills Blue Rhythm Band's rendition reached No. 8 that year. "Solitude" was recorded at least 28 times between 1934 and 1942. Vocalist Billie Holiday recorded the song several times in the 1940s and 1950s, "with the world-weariness of the words matching to an almost disturbing degree her late-career persona". One of her renditions was added to the Grammy Hall of Fame in 2021. Writing in 2012, Ted Gioia commented that "For the most part, 'Solitude' serves as a tribute piece nowadays, often played in an overly respectful manner that captures more the sound than the spirit of [Ellington]".

Other versions
Rex Stewart – Rex Stuart Plays Duke Ellington (1955)
Billy Eckstine – The Duke, The Blues and Me! (1957)
Al Hibbler – Big Boy Blues (195-?)
Josephine Baker – Josephine Baker Chante L'Amour (1959)
Tony Bennett with Count Basie – In Person! (1959)
Lucho Gatica – Lucho in Mexico (196-?)
Priscilla Paris – Priscilla Love Billy (196-?)
Carmen McRae – Carmen McRae (rec. 196-?, rel. 1971)
Earl Hines – West Side Story (1975)
Jackie Washington – Blues & Sentimental (1976)
Mutter Slater – single (B-side of Dancing on Air) (Rocket Records, 1976)
Oscar Peterson and Niels-Henning Ørsted Pedersen – Oscar Peterson digital at Montreux (1980)
Gregory Hines – Duke Ellington's Sophisticated Ladies : Original Broadway cast recording (1981)
Dirty Dozen Brass Band – Music With a Smile (1987)
Clark Terry – Just Friends (1989)
Joe Pass – Summer Nights (1990)
Paul Bley – Caravan Suite (1993)
Terence Blanchard – In My Solitude: The Billie Holiday Songbook (1994)
Tina May – It Ain't Necessarily So (1995)

See also
List of 1930s jazz standards

References 

1930s jazz standards
1934 songs
Jazz songs
Songs with lyrics by Eddie DeLange
Songs with lyrics by Irving Mills
Songs with music by Duke Ellington